Stephanie Hammerman-Roach is the world's first CrossFit Level 2 trainer with cerebral palsy. CrossFit has said she is the first woman with Cerebral Palsy to work for them as a trainer and Nike signed her as their first sponsored adaptive athlete from 2018 to 2022. She cites the death of one of her best friends in 2005 as her inspiration. She was diagnosed with Hodgkin's Lymphoma Stage 3B in 2016.

Hammerman, known as Steph or The Hammer, grew up in Merrick, New York and graduated from Kennedy High School in 2008. Hammerman went on to study for a master's degree in college student affairs at Nova Southeastern University and an undergraduate degree from Lynn University in Boca Raton, Florida.

Career 

Steph began her career as a child model with a feature for Toys R’Us. She was a special guest commentator as a toy reviewer on CNN by the age of 6 and was a columnist for WE magazine at 10.

At the age of 30, Hammerman had been featured on Good Morning America, CNN, in Shape, People and on the YouTube channel CrossFit. Hammerman has been involved in fitness since 2012.

Personal 
Stephanie married Tyler Roach in a private ceremony on December 4, 2020. They reside in Scottsdale, AZ.

Steph has 3 siblings that were unnamed in her personal memoir.

References

Living people
Year of birth missing (living people)
People from Merrick, New York
John F. Kennedy High School (Bellmore, New York) alumni
Nova Southeastern University alumni
Lynn University alumni
Nike, Inc. people
CrossFit